HD 45350 b is an extrasolar planet located approximately 160 light-years away in the constellation of Auriga. It has a minimum mass about 1.79 times that of Jupiter. The mean distance of the planet from the star is more than the distance between Mars and the Sun, but the eccentricity of the orbit is nothing short of remarkable; at periastron the planet is as close to the star as Mercury is from the Sun, but at apastron it is 8 times further. No doubt seasons on the planet would be extreme.

The planet HD 45350 b is named Peitruss. The name was selected in the NameExoWorlds campaign by Luxembourg, during the 100th anniversary of the IAU. Peitruss is derived from the name of the Luxembourg river Pétrusse.  The year 2019-2020 class of 3B from the Luxembourgish Echternach high school won the contest to name both the star and its planet. The students who helped name both celestial objects were Lucien Nicolas Berger, Léna Boucq Kieffel, Ben de Boer, Cédric Dehlez, Nicolas Delhez, Sergio Manuel Dias Costa, Pierre Fusshoeller, Jil Menei, Philippe Schaack and Claire Zeien. The overseeing committee members who organized the contest and the vote of the respective celestial objects were Eric Buttini, Patrick Michaely, Nicolas Faber, Jeanny-Jungbluth-Schmidt and Yanna Di Ronco.

Dynamical simulations covering a period of 107 years show that a second, low-mass, planet could only orbit stably if it were no more than 0.2 AU away from the star; in the simulations, these planets show oscillations in eccentricity up to an eccentricity of 0.25.  Radial velocity observations rule out any such planet whose mass is greater than 4 Neptune masses.

References

External links 

 
 HD 45350b Simulation
 

Auriga (constellation)
Exoplanets discovered in 2004
Giant planets
Exoplanets detected by radial velocity
Exoplanets with proper names

de:HD 45350 b